The Des Moines Dragons were a minor league basketball team in the International Basketball Association. They were located in Des Moines, Iowa, and played at the Iowa Veterans Memorial Auditorium. The Dragons were owned by Paul Miller, and Dick Giesen. The Des Moines Dragons were the International Basketball Association champions in 2000 and the runner-up in 2001 to the Dakota Wizards. They played in the IBA from the 1997-1998 season until the end of the 2000-2001 season. The Dragons were coached by Glenn Duhon from 1997 through 2000 and Michael Born from 2000 through 2001. The Dragons played their home games at Veterans Auditorium from 1997 through 2001. In 2000 Lonnie Cooper received the IBA Playoffs MVP. Lonnie Cooper of the Dragons received the 2001 IBA MVP as well as the IBA Finals MVP award. Also in 2001 Michael Born was named the Coach of the year in the IBA along with David Joerger of the Dakota Wizards. The Dragons were the IBA organization of the year in all four years of their existence.

Playoffs
In 1998 the Dragons were swept 2-0 by the Fargo-Moorhead Beez in the IBA Semifinals. The Dragons swept Rochester 2-0 in the 1999 IBA Semifinals before losing to Mansfield 1-2 in the IBA Division Finals. In 2000 the Dragons had better luck in the playoffs, they started out by sweeping Billings 2-0 in the IBA Division Semifinals and Fargo-Moorhead 3-0 in the IBA Division Finals before going on to defeat the Magic City Snowbears 3-1 in the IBA Finals for the Dragons only championship. During the Dragons final season they swept Fargo-Moorhead 2-0 in the IBA Semifinals as well as sweeping Souixland 2-0 in the Division Finals. The Dragons took a 2-0 IBA Finals lead against the Dakota Wizards before losing three straight to lose the finals 3-2.

Year-by-year record

Former Dragons players

Tyrone Barksdale
Michael Born
Kris Bruton
Ron Bayless
Lonnie Cooper
Ben Ebong
Rosell Ellis
Jon Hale
Chad Faulkner
Tye Fields
Kirk Ford
Edward Johnson
Greg Jones
Richmond McIver
Roland Miller
Michael Nurse
Carl Pickett
Kevin Sams
Curt Smith
Larry Thompson
Johnny Tyson
Troy Wade
Jason Williams
Justin Wimmer
Jason Winningham

References

External links
 Des Moines Dragons official website 
 IBA Standings and Statistics
 Des Moines Dragons OurSportsCentral homepage
 Des Moines Dragons fold, decline CBA's offer  from The Des Moines Register
 Dragons resume playoffs minus one  from The Des Moines Register
 (April 1, 1998) Dragons' GM on fire from Iowa State Daily
 (January 22, 1998) Player Is Suspended After Choking Ref from The New York Times
 Iowa House Resolution 116 on Des Moines Dragons 
 Des Moines Dragons Tryout Press Release
Des Moines Dragons Box Score 

Defunct basketball teams in the United States
Sports in Des Moines, Iowa
Basketball teams in Iowa
1997 establishments in Iowa
2001 disestablishments in Iowa
Basketball teams established in 1997
Basketball teams disestablished in 2001